The 1844 United States presidential election in Massachusetts took place between November 1 and December 4, 1844, as part of the 1844 United States presidential election. Voters chose 12 representatives, or electors to the Electoral College, who voted for President and Vice President.

Massachusetts voted for the Whig candidate, Henry Clay, over Democratic candidate James K. Polk and Liberty candidate James G. Birney. Clay won Massachusetts by a margin of 10.62%.

With 8.20% of the popular vote, Massachusetts would prove to be James G. Birney's second strongest state after neighboring New Hampshire.

Results

See also
 United States presidential elections in Massachusetts

References

Massachusetts
1844
1844 Massachusetts elections